The Codex Egberti is a gospel book illuminated in the scriptorium of the Reichenau Monastery for Egbert, bishop of Trier (980–993). It is now held in the city library of Trier (Cod.24).

Bibliography
 Codex Egberti – Stadtbibliothek Trier, Ms. 24, Luzern Faksimile Verlag, 2005, 330 p.
 Gunther Franz, « Ein Höhepunkt der Buchmalerei vor tausend Jahren Die Geschichte des Egbert-Codex in Trier », Trierer theologische Zeitschrift, Trier, Paulinus-Druckerei, vol. 118, no 4, 2009, p. 277-286

External links 
  Stadtbibliothek Weberbach
  Bildindex.de

Ottonian illuminated manuscripts
10th-century illuminated manuscripts